Oswald Griffiths (12 January 1909 – December 1989) was a Welsh rugby union and professional rugby league footballer who played in the 1930s.

Playing career

International honours
Ossie Griffiths won 4 caps for Wales (RL) in 1935–1936 while at St. Helens.

Championship final appearances
Ossie Griffiths played  in Wigan's 15–3 victory over Salford in the Championship Final during the 1933–34 season at Wilderspool Stadium, Warrington on Saturday 28 April 1934.

Note
"The British Rugby League Records Book" states that Ossie Griffiths won his Wales caps while at St. Helens 1935–1936. However, Ossie Griffiths left St. Helens for Halifax on 16 November 1935, and did not resign for St. Helens until 1 February 1938, consequently any cap(s) won after 16 November 1935, and before the end of 1936 would likely have been while at Halifax.

References

External links
Statistics at wigan.rlfans.com
Profile at saints.org.uk

1909 births
1989 deaths
Cwmavon RFC players
Halifax R.L.F.C. players
Rugby league centres
Rugby league locks
Rugby league players from Neath Port Talbot
Rugby league second-rows
Rugby union players from Neath Port Talbot
St Helens R.F.C. players
Wales national rugby league team players
Welsh rugby league players
Welsh rugby union players
Wigan Warriors players